James Lowther may refer to:

Sir James Lowther, 4th Baronet (1673–1755), Member of Parliament for Appleby, Carlisle, and Cumberland
James Lowther, 1st Earl of Lonsdale (1736–1802), electoral magnate in northern England, Member of Parliament for Cockermouth, Cumberland, Haslemere and Westmorland
Colonel James Lowther (1753–1837), Member of Parliament for Appleby, Haslemere and Westmorland
James Lowther (politician, born 1840) (1840–1904), Tory politician and sportsman, sometime Chief Secretary for Ireland, Member of Parliament for the Isle of Thanet, Lincolnshire North, and York
James Lowther, 1st Viscount Ullswater (1855–1949), Conservative politician and Speaker of the House of Commons
James Lowther, 7th Earl of Lonsdale (1922–2006), British peer